Piet Norval and Kevin Ullyett were the defending champions, but did not participate this year.

Paul Haarhuis and Sandon Stolle won in the final 6–1, 6–7(2–7), 7–6(9–7), against Ivan Ljubičić and Jack Waite.

Seeds

Draw

Draw

External links
Main Draw

2000 ATP Tour